Kallur is a village in the Kumbakonam taluk of Thanjavur district, Tamil Nadu, India.

Demographics 

As per the 2001 census, Kallur had a total population of 2696 with 1322 males and 1374 females. The sex ratio was 1039. The literacy rate was 61.39

References 

 

Villages in Thanjavur district